Pseudochazara is a genus of butterflies within the family Nymphalidae.

Species
 Pseudochazara alpina (Staudinger, 1878)
 Pseudochazara amalthea (Frivaldsky, 1845)
 Pseudochazara anthelea (Hübner, [1823-1824])
 Pseudochazara atlantis (Austaut, 1905)
 Pseudochazara baldiva (Moore, 1865)
 Pseudochazara beroe (Herrich-Schäffer, [1844])
 Pseudochazara cingovskii Gross, 1973
 Pseudochazara daghestana Holik, 1955
 Pseudochazara droshica (Tytler, 1926)
 Pseudochazara euxina (Kuznetsov, 1909)
 Pseudochazara geyeri (Herrich-Schäffer, [1846])
 Pseudochazara gilgitica (Tytler, 1926)
 Pseudochazara graeca (Staudinger, 1870)
 Pseudochazara hippolyte (Esper, 1783)
 Pseudochazara kanishka Aussem, 1980
 Pseudochazara lydia (Staudinger, 1878)
 Pseudochazara mamurra (Herrich-Schäffer, [1846])
 Pseudochazara mniszechii (Herrich-Schäffer, [1851])
 Pseudochazara orestes de Prins & Poorten, 1981
 Pseudochazara pallida (Staudinger, 1901)
 Pseudochazara panjshira Wyat & Omoto, 1966
 Pseudochazara pelopea (Klug, 1832)
 Pseudochazara porphyritica Clench & Shoumatoff, 1956
 Pseudochazara schahrudensis (Staudinger, 1881)
 Pseudochazara schakuhensis (Staudinger, 1881)
 Pseudochazara thelephassa (Geyer, [1827])
 Pseudochazara turkestana (Grum-Grshimailo, 1882)
 Pseudochazara watsoni (Clench & Shoumatoff, 1956)
 Pseudochazara williamsi Romei, 1927

References 
 , 2017: Compared morphology and distribution of the taxa described of Pseudochazara williamsi (Romei, 1927) [= "Pseudochazara hippolyte" Esper from Spain]. Are they valid subspecies or only the result of phenotypic plasticity (ecological forms)? (Lepidoptera, Nymphalidae, Satyrinae). Atalanta 48 (1-4): 188-196. Full article:

External links
 Satyrinae of the Western Palearctic: 
 Pseudochazara de Lesse, 1951 in Markku Savela's Lepidoptera and Some Other Life Forms:  
 Butterfly Conservation Armenia: 

 
Satyrini
Butterfly genera
Taxonomy articles created by Polbot